Colin Arturo Strickland (born November 7, 1986) is an American bicycle racer specializing in gravel racing and fixed gear criteriums. He first became known for his wins in the Red Hook Crit series, before finding further success at gravel races like Unbound Gravel.

Biography
Colin Strickland was born in 1986 in Johnson City, Texas, and grew up on a farm.  By his twenties he had picked up cycling as a form of transportation. His first experience with bicycle racing was competing in an Alleycat at the 2010 North American Handmade Bike Show, a race that he won. 

In 2019 Strickland rose in prominence by winning the Unbound Gravel 200. While already known as a gravel racer from winning the Gravel Worlds in 2017 and 2018, his victory at Unbound was recognized due to the presence of several current UCI World Tour professional riders.

Association with Mo Wilson

On May 11, 2022, a cyclist named Anna Moriah "Mo" Wilson was allegedly murdered by Strickland's partner of three years, Kaitlin Armstrong in Austin, Texas. Strickland and Wilson allegedly had a romantic relationship during a brief split between Strickland and Armstrong, which appears to have continued after Strickland and Armstrong reconciled.

Major results

2015
1st Red Hook Crit Milan
3rd Road race, National Amateur Road Championships
2016
 1st Red Hook Crit
1st Brooklyn
1st London
1st Barcelona
2017
 1st Gravel Worlds
2018
 1st Gravel Worlds
 2nd Overall Tour of America's Dairyland
1st Stages 4 & 10
2019
1st Unbound Gravel
1st The Rift Gravel Race, Iceland
2020
2nd Mid-South Gravel

References

External Links

Strickland's Profile on Red Bull

American male cyclists
Living people
1986 births
Cyclists from Texas